Schweinfurt is an electoral constituency (German: Wahlkreis) represented in the Bundestag. It elects one member via first-past-the-post voting. Under the current constituency numbering system, it is designated as constituency 250. It is located in northwestern Bavaria, comprising the city of Schweinfurt and the districts of Kitzingen and Landkreis Schweinfurt.

Schweinfurt was created for the inaugural 1949 federal election. Since 2013, it has been represented by Anja Weisgerber of the Christian Social Union (CSU).

Geography
Schweinfurt is located in northwestern Bavaria. As of the 2021 federal election, it comprises the independent city of Schweinfurt and the districts of Kitzingen and Landkreis Schweinfurt.

History
Schweinfurt was created in 1949. In the 1949 election, it was Bavaria constituency 39 in the numbering system. In the 1953 through 1961 elections, it was number 234. In the 1965 through 1998 elections, it was number 236. In the 2002 and 2005 elections, it was number 251. Since the 2009 election, it has been number 250.

Originally, the constituency comprised the independent cities of Schweinfurt and Kitzingen and the districts of Landkreis Schweinfurt, Landkreis Kitzingen, and Gerolzhofen. It acquired its current borders in the 1976 election.

Members
Like most constituencies in rural Bavaria, it is an CSU safe seat, the party holding the seat continuously since its creation. It was first represented by Friedrich Funk from 1949 to 1965, followed by Max Schulze-Vorberg from 1965 to 1976. Michael Glos was representative from 1976 to 2013, a total of ten consecutive terms. Anja Weisgerber was elected in 2013, and re-elected in 2017 and 2021.

Election results

2021 election

2017 election

2013 election

2009 election

References

Federal electoral districts in Bavaria
1949 establishments in West Germany
Constituencies established in 1949
Schweinfurt
Kitzingen (district)
Schweinfurt (district)